The following radio stations broadcast on FM frequency 106.7 MHz:

Argentina
 LRR330 Cielo in Apóstoles, Misiones
 LRM384 Génesis in San Pedro, Buenos Aires
 Horizonte in Córdoba
 Imagen in Alcorta, Santa Fe
 Laser in Merlo, San Luis
 LV3 Cadena 3 Rosario in Rosario, Santa Fe
 Millenium in Buenos Aires
 Radio María in Saladas, Corrientes
 Radio María in Santiago del Estero
 Retro in San José, Entre Ríos
 Soñada in Las Parejas, Santa Fe
 Trip in Rosario, Santa Fe

Australia
 2KY in Orange, New South Wales
 3HOT in Mildura, Victoria
 3PBS in Melbourne, Victoria
 Radio National in Spencer Gulf, South Australia

Canada (Channel 294)
 CBHB-FM in Mulgrave, Nova Scotia
 CFDV-FM in Red Deer, Alberta
 CFET-FM in Tagish, Yukon
 CHSV-FM in Hudson/Saint-Lazare, Quebec
 CIKZ-FM in Kitchener/Waterloo, Ontario
 CION-FM-2 in Chicoutimi, Quebec
 CJIT-FM in Lac Megantic, Quebec
 CJRX-FM in Lethbridge/Taber, Alberta
 CJWT-FM in Timmins, Ontario
 VF2347 in Logan Lake, British Columbia
 VF2557 in Pemberton, British Columbia
 VF2577 in 100 Mile House, British Columbia

China 
 CNR The Voice of China in Baicheng
 CNR Business Radio in Wuyishan

Europe
 Radio Centraal in Antwerp, Belgium
 Europa FM in Bucharest, Romania

Indonesia
 Mara FM (PM3FHQ) in Bandung
 Merdeka FM in Surabaya

Malaysia
 Ai FM in Selangor and Western Pahang
 Minnal FM in Kota Bharu, Kelantan
 Radio Klasik in Johor Bahru, Johor and Singapore

Mexico
 XEWV-FM in Mexicali, Baja California
 XHEPQ-FM in La Loma, Coahuila
 XHOJ-FM on Cerro Grande Santa Fe (Guadalajara), Jalisco
 XHPBP-FM in Puebla, Puebla
 XHQH-FM in Ixmiquilpan, Hidalgo
 XHSCBU-FM in Xalatlaco, Estado de México
 XHSCEW-FM in Teposcolula, Oaxaca
 XHSCHY-FM in Tlatlauquitepec, Puebla
 XHSIAH-FM in Ejido Ignacio Zaragoza, Berriozabal municipality, Chiapas
 XHSIAX-FM in Rancho Viejo, Santa Cruz Zenzontepec municipality, Oaxaca
 XHSILL-FM in Hermosillo, Sonora
 XHSN-FM in Nogales, Sonora
 XHTLAN-FM in Mazatlán, Sinaloa
 XHTPC-FM in Tapachula, Chiapas
 XHUAR-FM in Ciudad Juárez, Chihuahua
 XHVK-FM in Gómez Palacio, Durango (clear to 100.7)

New Zealand
Various low-power stations up to 1 watt

Palestine
 Al-Aqsa Voice in Dabas Mall, Tulkarem

Philippines
 DWET-FM in Metro Manila, Philippines
 DYQC in Cebu City, Philippines

United States (Channel 294)
 KAAZ-FM in Spanish Fork, Utah
 KBFO in Aberdeen, South Dakota
 KBPI in Denver, Colorado
 KBZU in Benton, Arkansas
 KCHX in Midland, Texas
 KDKN in Ellington, Missouri
 KGJN-LP in Grand Junction, Colorado
 KGPZ-LP in Grants Pass, Oregon
 KGTN-LP in Georgetown, Texas
 KGTW in Ketchikan, Alaska
 KHGN in Hugoton, Kansas
 KHOX-LP in Walnut Ridge, Arkansas
 KIEZ-LP in Monroe, Louisiana
 KIKD in Lake City, Iowa
 KIRQ in Hailey, Idaho
 KIXT in Hewitt, Texas
 KJIT-LP in Bismarck, North Dakota
 KJKB in Early, Texas
 KJSL-LP in Fort Smith, Arkansas
 KJUG-FM in Tulare, California
 KKOS-LP in McPherson, Kansas
 KKND in Port Sulphur, Louisiana
 KKWN in Cashmere, Washington
 KLLF-LP in Roseburg, Oregon
 KLTH in Lake Oswego, Oregon
 KMRZ-FM in Superior, Wyoming
 KNAN in Nanakuli, Hawaii
 KNKI in Pinetop, Arizona
 KPCT-LP in Parachute, Colorado
 KPCZ-FM in Rayne, Louisiana
 KPLN in Lockwood, Montana
 KPPV in Prescott Valley, Arizona
 KPQS in Waterford, California
 KQKX in Norfolk, Nebraska
 KQNK-FM in Norton, Kansas
 KQTY-FM in Borger, Texas
 KROQ-FM in Pasadena, California
 KRQR in Orland, California
 KRTI in Grinnell, Iowa
 KRVI in Mount Vernon, Missouri
 KSMY in Lompoc, California
 KSOW-LP in Cottage Grove, Oregon
 KTKX in Terrell Hills, Texas
 KTPO in Kootenai, Idaho
 KTUZ-FM in Okarche, Oklahoma
 KTYG-LP in Centralia, Washington
 KUMX in North Fort Polk, Louisiana
 KVCN in Los Alamos, New Mexico
 KYTZ in Walhalla, North Dakota
 KYXA in Homer, Louisiana
 KZJZ in Babbitt, Minnesota
 KZLX-LP in Maryville, Missouri
 KZZA in Muenster, Texas
 WAKL in Gainesville, Georgia
 WAOB-FM in Beaver Falls, Pennsylvania
 WATQ in Chetek, Wisconsin
 WBDR in Copenhagen, New York
 WCDW in Port Dickinson, New York
 WDBP-LP in Rocky Mount, North Carolina
 WEAD-LP in Wendell, North Carolina
 WEAK-LP in Athens, Ohio
 WFBT in Carolina Beach, North Carolina
 WFGA in Hicksville, Ohio
 WFGW in Norris, Tennessee
 WGGP-LP in Big Pine Key, Florida
 WHFI in Lindside, West Virginia
 WHTO in Iron Mountain, Michigan
 WIXP-LP in Greenville, Mississippi
 WIZN in Vergennes, Vermont
 WJFK-FM in Manassas, Virginia
 WJJY-FM in Brainerd, Minnesota
 WKGS in Irondequoit, New York
 WKMX in Enterprise, Alabama
 WKRU in Allouez, Wisconsin
 WKVK in Semora, North Carolina
 WLFX in Berea, Kentucky
 WLLZ in Detroit, Michigan
 WLQQ in West Lafayette, Indiana
 WLTW in New York, New York
 WMJX in Boston, Massachusetts
 WMVI in Mount Vernon, Indiana
 WNFN in Franklin, Tennessee
 WNKR in Williamstown, Kentucky
 WOKA-FM in Douglas, Georgia
 WPPN in Des Plaines, Illinois
 WPWQ in Mount Sterling, Illinois
 WRHC-LP in Three Oaks, Michigan
 WRIS-FM in Mount Horeb, Wisconsin
 WSMU-LP in Raleigh, North Carolina
 WSRT in Gaylord, Michigan
 WSTZ-FM in Vicksburg, Mississippi
 WTCB in Orangeburg, South Carolina
 WTLC-FM in Greenwood, Indiana
 WTUB-LP in Lizemores, West Virginia
 WVKM in Matewan, West Virginia
 WVLH-LP in Coudersport, Pennsylvania
 WWKL in Hershey, Pennsylvania
 WWZD-FM in New Albany, Mississippi
 WXDJ in Fort Lauderdale, Florida
 WXTP in North Windham, Maine
 WXXL in Tavares, Florida
 WYEJ-LP in Anderson, South Carolina
 WZCB in Dublin, Ohio
 WZNX in Sullivan, Illinois
 WZZL in Reidland, Kentucky

References

Lists of radio stations by frequency